Carl Christian "Calle" Johansson (born 14 February 1967) is a Swedish former assistant coach with the Washington Capitals and former professional ice hockey defenceman who played 17 seasons in the National Hockey League between 1987 and 2004, most of it with the Capitals. He has worked as hockey colour commentator for Swedish Canal+ and worked as an assistant for six seasons for Frölunda HC in the Swedish Elitserien before returning to the Capitals organization.

Playing career
Johansson was drafted out of Sweden by the Buffalo Sabres, he was picked 14th overall by the Sabres in the 1985 NHL Entry Draft. His first season, 1987–88, was a good one, as he compiled 38 assists and 42 points and was named to the NHL All-Rookie Team. However, the next season he was traded to the Washington Capitals along with a second round draft choice in the 1989 NHL Entry Draft for Clint Malarchuk, Grant Ledyard, and a sixth round draft pick in the 1991 NHL Entry Draft.

Johansson prospered in Washington, as he became one of Washington's best defenceman over the next 15 seasons. Although he was behind the shadow of higher profile defencemen in Washington, such as Scott Stevens, Rod Langway, Kevin Hatcher, Al Iafrate and Sergei Gonchar, he was a solid contributor for the club. In the 1992–93 NHL season, Johansson was part of the defense core in Washington that set a new record for team defence scoring. Although Hatcher, Iafrate and Sylvain Côté all scored over 20 goals, Johansson helped get to the record with his seven goals.

Johansson was part of the Washington team that made their improbable run to the Stanley Cup finals in 1998, but the Capitals were defeated by the Detroit Red Wings.

Johansson retired after the 2002–03 NHL season, but the Toronto Maple Leafs persuaded him to come back and help their team in their playoff run the next season. However, the Leafs failed to win the Cup, and Johansson retired for good after the playoffs.

Television career
After retiring the second time around, Johansson continued to work as a colour commentator and did studio analysis during game intermissions on Swedish Canal+. He was doing both Elitserien and NHL games and was one of the two main colour commentators at Canal+, the other one being former Tre Kronor coach Anders "Ankan" Parmström. Canal+ lost the Swedish broadcasting rights for NHL to the Viasat Group ahead of the 2009–2010 season. Together with former Canal+ commentator Niklas Holmgren, with whom Calle has developed a great chemistry when commentating, they subsequently signed for Viasat where they now continue in the same manner as when at Canal+.

Coaching career
Johansson served as an assistant coach with Frolunda of the Swedish Elite League in 2006–07.  On 18 July 2012 Johansson was named an assistant coach to the Washington Capitals, joining former Capitals teammate Adam Oates behind the bench. Two seasons later, on 23 June 2014 the Capitals announced that Johansson was leaving the team to rejoin his family in Sweden.

Awards
Swedish Champion with IF Björklöven in 1987.
Named to the NHL All-Rookie Team in 1988.
Gold medal at the 1991 and 1992 Men's World Ice Hockey Championships.
 Named to the World Cup of Hockey All-Star Team in 1996.

Records
Second in *Washington Capitals' history for career games played (983).

Career statistics

Regular season and playoffs

International

See also
NHL All-Rookie Team
List of NHL players with 1000 games played

References

External links
Profile at hockeydraftcentral.com

1967 births
Buffalo Sabres draft picks
Buffalo Sabres players
Frölunda HC players
IF Björklöven players
Ice hockey players at the 1998 Winter Olympics
EHC Kloten players
Living people
National Hockey League first-round draft picks
Olympic ice hockey players of Sweden
Sportspeople from Gothenburg
Swedish expatriate sportspeople in Austria
Swedish expatriate ice hockey players in Canada
Swedish expatriate ice hockey players in the United States
Swedish ice hockey defencemen
Toronto Maple Leafs players
Washington Capitals coaches
Washington Capitals players
Washington Capitals scouts